Mike Hogan (born 1963) is a Canadian sportscaster who is a sports talk radio host on TSN Radio 1050 in Toronto, Ontario.  He also serves as the play-by-play voice for the Toronto Argonauts of the Canadian Football League for that station's gameday broadcasts. Hogan was formerly a long time sports talk radio host on Toronto station CJCL (AM), branded "The Fan 590", until he was relieved of those duties on June 24, 2010. Hogan was born in Kingston, Ontario.

Fan 590 tenure
Hogan previously hosted a weekday morning sports radio show on the Fan 590 called The Mike Hogan Show (originally named The Bullpen) from 9 AM to 12 PM.  Typically, the first hour was hosted solely by Hogan as he takes calls from listeners, while the last two hours was previously co-hosted by another guest sportscaster from TSN in the early 2000s, but later changed to a guest sportscaster from Rogers Sportsnet (due to the station being acquired by Rogers Communications) as they both discussed daily sports topics while also interviewing guests.  During the later part of the 2000s, Mike Toth became the mainstay co-host of The Bullpen for the last two hours of the show. In late 2009, Toth was let go from the station, leaving Hogan as the sole host for the full 3 hours.

During both the CFL and NFL seasons, the first hour on Fridays was co-hosted with former Argonaut and former NFL player Chris Schultz as a one-hour show dedicated to a weekly discussion on the CFL and/or NFL called "Football Friday". Inside the Argos was initially a regular segment of The Mike Hogan Show during the first hour on Wednesdays in the late 2000s until Hogan's show was cancelled. The show was co-hosted by former Argonaut defensive back Adrion Smith during 2007, and offensive lineman Sandy Annunziata during 2008 and 2009.

During the CFL season, Hogan also served as the play-by-play voice for the Toronto Argonauts on The Fan 590's radio broadcasts (or webcasts from their website if the games conflicted with a Toronto Blue Jays radio broadcast) with former Argonauts linebacker Pete Martin as his colour analyst. Also during the season, Hogan hosted a one-hour show dedicated to a weekly discussion on the Argonauts featuring interviews of the team members called Inside the Argos. This program aired on the FAN 590 on a weekly basis during the midweek evenings.

TSN Radio 1050 tenure
On April 12, 2011, it was announced that Hogan, along with Matt Cauz, would host TSN Radio 1050's weekend show, "TSN 1050 Game Day". Additionally, Hogan co-hosts 'Football Sunday' with Chris Schultz, from 11am-1pm, covering the CFL, NFL, NCAA and CIS.  Hogan also hosts "Argos All Access", a weekly radio show on the Toronto Argonauts broadcast every Monday at 7 PM EST.  Hogan also serves as the play-by-play voice of the Argonauts during TSN Radio 1050's broadcasts of their games, with Sandy Annunziata as the colour analyst.

Krown Countdown U/Krown Gridiron Nation on TSN
Starting in the 2017 season, Hogan joined Krown Countdown U radio on the TSN Radio network as a co-host with Jim Mullin and as a panelist on the TV show joining Gord Randall. He moved with the TV show in 2019 as it rebranded to Krown Gridiron Nation on TSN from CHCH TV and CBCSports.ca, commenting on Canadian football players in the NCAA and U SPORTS football.

Other sportscasting background
Hogan previously served as the radio play-by-play voice for the Wilfrid Laurier Golden Hawks football team on CKGL '570 News' based in Kitchener, Ontario. He has also provided play-by-play of OUA basketball and football games on CHCH-TV's weekly broadcasts of the OUA Game of the Week, as well as providing weekly football analysis on Global TV's Global Sports (formerly ''Sportsline).

Hogan has also contributed some blogs for the CFL's website.

References

External links
 
Toronto Argonauts press release
Mike Hogan interview transcript
Fan 590 "Inside The Argos" MP3/Podcast page

1963 births
Living people
Canadian talk radio hosts
Canadian television sportscasters
Canadian radio sportscasters
Canadian sports talk radio hosts
Sportspeople from Kingston, Ontario
Canadian people of Irish descent
Canadian Football League announcers
Toronto Argonauts personnel